Cristian Castaño Contreras (born 12 September 1970) is a Mexican politician affiliated with the National Action Party. He has served as a federal deputy of the LVI and LX Legislatures of the Mexican Congress representing Nuevo León, and previously served as a local deputy in the LXVIII Legislature of the Congress of Nuevo León.

References

1970 births
Living people
Politicians from Monterrey
National Action Party (Mexico) politicians
20th-century Mexican politicians
21st-century Mexican politicians
Deputies of the LX Legislature of Mexico
Members of the Chamber of Deputies (Mexico) for Nuevo León
Members of the Congress of Nuevo León